Brihaspa chrysostomus is a moth in the family Crambidae. It was described by Zeller in 1852. It is found in Kenya, South Africa and Zambia.

References

Moths described in 1852
Schoenobiinae